Kortner is a surname. Notable people with the surname include:

Fritz Kortner (1892–1970), Austrian stage and film actor and theatre director
Olaf Kortner (1920–1998), Norwegian politician